Eddie Chan Shu-fai (born 29 October 1990) is a Hong Kong pro-democracy politician of the New Territories West, social activist, former vice-convener of the Civil Human Rights Front, Secretary of the Hong Kong Catholic Justice and Peace Committee, president of the Lingnan University Student Union, Secretary-General of the Hong Kong Federation of Students and a former district Councillor for the Yuen Long District.

In May 2013, he along with 10 other activists filed a complaint against the police at the Independent Police Complaints Council (IPCC) for brutality against protesters.

Politics
Chan ran for the Yuen Long District in the 2019 Hong Kong local elections and won with over 1775 votes, which represented 52.2% of the total votes cast.

References

1990 births
Living people
HKFS people
Hong Kong democracy activists
District councillors of Yuen Long District
Alumni of Lingnan University (Hong Kong)